Robin Mark Askwith (born 12 October 1950) is an English actor and singer who has appeared in a number of film, television and stage productions.

Making his film debut as Keating in the film if.... (1968), a role he would reprise in Britannia Hospital (1982), Askwith went on to appear in many films including Otley (1969), Alfred the Great (1969), Nicholas and Alexandra (1971) and The Canterbury Tales (1972), the horror films Tower of Evil (1972), The Flesh and Blood Show (1972) and Horror Hospital (1973) and the comedy films Bless This House (1972), Carry On Girls (1973) and No Sex Please, We're British (1973). However it was his role as Timothy Lea in the Confessions film series that would make him a household name.

He has appeared on television as Fred Pickering in Beryl's Lot (1973–1975), Dave Deacon in Bottle Boys (1984–1985) and Ritchie de Vries in Coronation Street (2013–2014).

In 1975, at Drury Lane's New London Theatre, he was voted Most Promising Newcomer – Male at the "Evening Standard British Film Awards". Askwith's most recent television roles include Emmerdale, Benidorm and a main role in The Madame Blanc Mysteries.

Early life
Askwith was born in Southport, Lancashire, England, the eldest child of Nelson and Hazel Askwith (née Cookson). His father was an accountant but served in the Royal Navy during the Second World War and his mother in the Women's Royal Naval Service (WRENs). Unbeknown to Askwith, still a young child, he swam in a pool contaminated with insects; later that day Askwith's mother found him fully submerged underwater in the bath. Taken to hospital in an ambulance, Askwith was found to have contracted polio and had to spend nine months in an isolation ward at Southport Infirmary and had to learn how to walk again. Shortly after this, the family moved from Southport to Eastcote, London where Askwith was educated at Orley Farm in nearby Harrow. Particularly sporty at school, Askwith represented the school at football, rugby and cricket and after joining the Ruislip and Northwood Swimming Club, he represented the South Counties at backstroke.

Askwith began an interest in acting because his neighbour was the floor manager at Pinewood Studios where he and his neighbour's son would watch movies being filmed, including The Servant (1963) and Cleopatra (1963). The next-door neighbour of a friend was Carry On actor Kenneth Connor, and so Askwith began attending a local amateur dramatics group. He also did a stint of modelling for catalogues and appeared in several commercials for baked beans and Fairy Liquid. After finishing at Orley Farm at the age of twelve, Askwith attended Merchant Taylors' School, Northwood. He found the school unduly strict and became a rebellious student to the extent that Askwith and two friends stole several rifles from the school armoury and held up Pinner post office stealing hundreds of pounds' worth of stamps with the intention of returning them the following week. Askwith also persuaded a crane operator, who was carrying out work at the school, to lift the headmaster's car onto the school roof.

As a result of playing King Edward IV during a school production of Richard III, Askwith was approached by film director Lindsay Anderson, who had been in the audience, and encouraged to audition for a role in his upcoming film if..... Following a successful audition he played the role of Keating in the film.

Career
Following the success of if..., Askwith made his television debut as a yob in the BBC series Scene. He would also attend the Corona Theatre School in between acting jobs. Askwith had roles in the historical epic film Alfred the Great(1969), the thriller Otley (1969), and, playing the title role, in the film version of Hans Brinker and the Silver Skates (1969). In 1970, Askwith had his first major role in the comedy film Cool It Carol! (1970).

Askwith then appeared on television in series' such as Randall and Hopkirk (Deceased) and Father, Dear Father and a recurring role as Eddie in Please Sir! and its spin-off The Fenn Street Gang, before having his first regular role as Harvey Micklethwaite in the sitcom On The House in 1971. In 1970, Askwith starred in Scramble (1970), the first of four films he would make for the Children's Film Foundation, the others being All Coppers Are... (1971), Hide and Seek (1972) and The Hostages (1975). Askwith also had a role in the epic film Nicholas and Alexandra (1971). He would then have roles in television series' including Dixon of Dock Green, Public Eye, The Main Chance and Bless This House, and in a deleted scene from the film Brother Sun, Sister Moon (1972). Askwith also starred in a string of horror films: Tower of Evil (1972), The Flesh and Blood Show (1973) and Horror Hospital (1973).

After starring in Pasolini's The Canterbury Tales (1972) and the comedy film Four Dimensions of Greta (1972), Askwith played Mike Abbot in film version of television sitcom Bless This House (1972). During filming, Askwith became good friends with co-star Sid James. Other members of the cast included comedy stalwarts Peter Butterworth, Terry Scott, June Whitfield and Wendy Richard. Impressed by his performance, the producers offered Askwith a role in Carry On Girls (1973) which also starred Sid James.

Shortly after starring in Antony Balch's Horror Hospital (1973), Askwith was offered the starring role in Confessions of a Window Cleaner (1974), directed by Val Guest. The part had been turned down by Richard Beckinsale, Richard O'Sullivan, Nicky Henson and Dennis Waterman. The success of the film led to three sequels, Confessions of a Pop Performer (1975), Confessions of a Driving Instructor (1976) and Confessions from a Holiday Camp (1977).

Although the Confessions series came to an end with Confessions from a Holiday Camp, a fifth and a sixth film, Confessions of a Plumber's Mate and Confessions of a Private Soldier had been planned. Askwith even expressed a desire to direct Private Soldier, but neither film materialised. Plans to shoot a further made-for-video Confessions film in the 1980s also came to nothing, although by this time he was appearing in the poorly received ITV sitcom Bottle Boys (1984–1985).

He has also had roles in the soap operas EastEnders, Doctors, Hollyoaks and Coronation Street where he played a holiday tour guide named Aidan. The episodes of the soap that featured Askwith were filmed in Malta, close to the island of Gozo where he lived for many years. Askwith returned to Coronation Street on 11 December 2013 as musician Ritchie de Vries.

Askwith published his autobiography, titled The Confessions of Robin Askwith in 1999. In 2000, Askwith starred in the war-submarine film U-571 before having a role in the horror film The Asylum later that same year.

Askwith made a cameo appearance in the film Run For Your Wife, released in the UK on 14 February 2013. Askwith also appeared in an episode of Emmerdale in 2015. His role as con-man Marcus Hornby in the TV comedy drama Benidorm was broadcast in January 2016, and his episode of Casualty aired later that year.

In 2021, he joined the cast of Channel 5's popular drama series The Madame Blanc Mysteries appearing alongside Sue Holderness, Sally Lindsay and Steve Edge as a series regular. The first series received a positive reception which led to a Christmas special broadcast in 2022 succeeded by a second series to be broadcast in 2023. In December 2022, Askwith appeared in the fourth and final episode of the quartet, Strike: Troubled Blood, on BBC1, his character Steve, plays one of the suspected killers in the J.K. Rowling inspired mystery crime drama. 

In 2022, he is set to appear in the eighth series of Inside No. 9.

Stage work
Askwith's extensive work on stage, includes numerous farces such as Run For Your Wife, Casanova's Last Stand, One for the Road plus the stage Confessions sequel The Further Confessions of a Window Cleaner and Terry Johnson's Dead Funny. From 11 December 2012 – 27 January 2013, he appeared at the Mill at Sonning, Reading, Berkshire in Ray Cooney's farce Caught in the Net.

In pantomimes, Askwith has appeared with the Chuckle Brothers in Dick Whittington, with Frank Bruno and Sooty in a Wolverhampton production of Goldilocks and the 3 Bears and in various productions of Aladdin as Abanazar.

More unusual stage roles include the title role in a production of Brecht's The Resistible Rise of Arturo Ui, and the Child Catcher in a 2006 touring production of Chitty Chitty Bang Bang.

Personal life
Askwith had relationships with the actresses Cheryl Hall and later Linda Hayden during the 1970s. Askwith married actress Leonie Mellinger in 1988 but they later divorced. In 1996, he married Mary Smith, an aromatherapist but they divorced in 2002.

Askwith lives in Gozo, a Mediterranean island near Malta, having moved there in 1991, where his hobbies include swimming, underwater diving and yachting, however he regularly returns to the UK for tours, events and filming.

Askwith is a great-nephew of the comic Robb Wilton.

He is also a supporter of Queens Park Rangers F.C.

Filmography

Film

Television

Television commercials
 Baked Beans – brand unknown (year unknown)
 Summer County – margarine (1967) – directed by Ridley Scott
 Smith's Crisps – crisps (1967) with Simon Dee
 Pepsi Cola – drink (1971)
 Thomson Sky Tours – airways (1971) – directed by Tony Scott
 Dulux Magicote – paint (1971)
 TUF Boots – footwear – (1971) – directed by Terence Donovan
 KitKat – chocolate biscuits (1973)
 Guinness – alcohol (1973)
 Car Care – part work magazine (1985)

Documentaries
 Traincare '90 – Narrator (1990)
 King Rocker (2020)
 Keeping the British End Up! (2023)

Stage appearances
(incomplete)

 Play By Play – Kings Head Theatre, London (1975)
 The Further Confessions of a Window Cleaner – UK Tour (1977)
 The Further Confessions of a Window Cleaner – Rhodesia (1978)
 I Love My Wife – Prince of Wales Theatre, London (1978)
 Who Goes Bare? – UK Tour (1979)
 The Further Confessions of a Window Cleaner – New Zealand Tour (1980)
 The Further Confessions of a Window Cleaner – UK Tour (1980)
 Confessions From A Health Farm – New Zealand Tour (1981)
 Casanova's Last Stand – UK Tour (1982)
 The Resistible Rise of Arturo Ui – Cambridge Theatre Company (1982)
 Aladdin – Theatre Royal, Lincoln (1983)
 Run For Your Wife – Criterion Theatre, London (1984)
 Run For Your Wife – Criterion Theatre, London (1985)
 Doctor in the House – UK Tour (1985)
 Run For Your Wife – New Zealand Tour (1986)
 Funny Peculiar – Australia Tour (1986)
 Jack and the Beanstalk – Wimbledon Theatre, London (1986)
 Run For Your Wife – New Zealand Tour (1987)
 Run For Your Wife – Criterion Theatre, London (1987)
 Aladdin – De Montfort Hall, Leicester (1987)
 Les Enfants Terribles – Avignon Drama Festival (1988)
 One for the Road – Mercury Theatre, Colchester (1988)
 Dick Whittington – Richmond Theatre (1988)
 Run For Your Wife – Jersey (1989)
 One for the Road – UK Tour (1990)
 One for the Road – Australia Tour (1991)
 One for the Road – New Zealand Tour (1992)
 Cash on Delivery – Theatre Royal, Windsor (1993)
 Dick Whittington – Theatre Royal, Bath (1993)
 Run For Your Wife – UK Tour (1994)
 Cinderella – Wimbledon Theatre, London (1994)
 Doctor in the House – UK Tour (1995)
 Dick Whittington – New Theatre, Cardiff (1995)
 Aladdin – Lyceum Theatre, Crewe (1996)
 Dick Whittington – Lyceum Theatre, Sheffield (1997)
 Dick Whittington – Darlington Civic Theatre (1998)
 Aladdin – Yvonne Arnaud Theatre, Guildford (1999)
 Jack and the Beanstalk – Theatre Royal, Nottingham (2000)
 Goldilocks and the Three Bears – Grand Theatre, Wolverhampton (2001)
 Aladdin – Theatre Royal, Newcastle upon Tyne (2002)
 Bedside Manners – Pier Theatre, Bournemouth (2003)
 Aladdin – Milton Keynes Theatre, Milton Keynes (2003)
 Aladdin – New Wimbledon Theatre, London (2004)
 Canterbury Tales – The Castle, Nottingham (2005)
 Chitty Chitty Bang Bang – Sunderland Empire Theatre (2005)
 Dead Funny – UK Tour (2007)
 Aladdin – Cliffs Pavilion, Southend-on-Sea (2008)
 Aladdin – Theatre Royal, Lincoln (2010)
 Funny Money – The Mill at Sonning, Reading (2011)
 Caught in the Net – The Mill at Sonning, Reading (2012)
 Jack and the Beanstalk – Cliffs Pavilion, Southend-on-Sea (2017)
 Aladdin – Darlington Hippodrome (2018)
 Aladdin – Hull New Theatre (2019)

Recordings
 1975: Appears on the Confessions of a Pop Performer – Original Soundtrack Album
 1977: Single Confessions/This Space Is Reserved for You (credited as Robin Aswith)
 1994: Audiobook cassette, HarperCollins Audio – Ian Botham: My Autobiography – Don't Tell Kath read by Robin Askwith

References

Further reading
 Simon Sheridan Keeping the British End Up: Four Decades of Saucy Cinema 2011 (fourth edition) (Titan Publishing, London)
 The Confessions of Robin Askwith by Robin Askwith (Ebury Press) 1999

External links
 
 
 Robin Askwith interview

1950 births
Living people
English male film actors
English male television actors
English male stage actors
People from Southport
British male comedy actors